Jacky Courtillat (born 8 January 1943) is a French fencer. He won a bronze medal in the team foil event at the 1964 Summer Olympics.

References

External links
 

1943 births
Living people
French male foil fencers
Olympic fencers of France
Fencers at the 1960 Summer Olympics
Fencers at the 1964 Summer Olympics
Olympic bronze medalists for France
Olympic medalists in fencing
Medalists at the 1964 Summer Olympics
Sportspeople from Melun
20th-century French people
21st-century French people